The 1932 West Coast Army football team was an American football team that represented the West Coast Army during the 1932 college football season.

Schedule

References

West Coast Army